Jack Fitzpatrick may refer to:

 Jack Fitzpatrick (footballer), Australian rules footballer
 Jack Fitzpatrick (businessman), American businessman and politician
 Jack Fitzpatrick (cricketer), Australian cricketer
 Jack Fitzpatrick (hurler), Irish hurler

See also
 John Fitzpatrick (disambiguation)